The Catholic Register is a Canadian weekly newspaper published by the Archdiocese of Toronto. Founded in 1893, it is the oldest English-language Catholic publication in Canada. Based in Toronto, Ontario, and circulated nationally, it is published weekly in tabloid format, with 47 issues per year. 

News coverage includes local, national and international church-related news (frequently reprinted from other Catholic news syndication services), plus features, opinion columns and editorials. Its Youth Speak News section gives Canadian youth a weekly voice in the newspaper. 

The newspaper is distributed to more than 30,000 homes through subscription and to churches across Canada. It is also available to subscribers in digital format.

References

External links

Page about The Catholic Register at the Archdiocese of Toronto website

Catholic newspapers
Religious newspapers published in Canada
National newspapers published in Canada
Weekly newspapers published in Ontario
Newspapers published in Toronto
Publications established in 1893
1893 establishments in Ontario
Conservative media in Canada